The Moonee Valley Racing Club (MVRC) was founded by William Samuel (W.S.) Cox), in 1883 is located at The Valley Racecourse on McPherson Street, Moonee Ponds (a suburb of Melbourne, Victoria, Australia). It is one of three racing clubs in the Melbourne metropolitan area; the others are the Victoria Racing Club and the Melbourne Racing Club.

References

External links
MVRC website

Horse racing organisations in Australia
Sporting clubs in Melbourne
Sports clubs established in 1883
1883 establishments in Australia
Horse racing in Melbourne
Sport in the City of Moonee Valley